Otradnoye is a rural locality (a settlement) in Mikhaylovka Urban Okrug, Volgograd Oblast, Russia. The population was 1,889 as of 2010. There are 38 streets.

Geography 
Otradnoye is located 13 km southeast of Mikhaylovka. Semenovod is the nearest rural locality.

References 

Rural localities in Mikhaylovka urban okrug